House of Glory (HOG) is an American professional wrestling school and promotion created by Amazing Red and is now owned by Master P.

House of Glory was featured in an MTV news article. The promotion has run shows in New York and Toronto.

Current champions

Unlike other professional wrestling championships, House of Glory does not exercise the usage of rematch clauses to former champions upon losing a title.

Championship history

World Heavyweight Championship 

Ricochet was inaugural champion, with his reign being the shortest at 125 days. Anthony Gangone has the most reigns at two, with his second reign being the longest at 1,374 days.

HOG Heavyweight Championship Tournament (2014)

Reigns

|-
!1
|Ricochet
|August 16, 2014
|Quest For Glory
|Ridgewood, NY
|1
|
|align="left"|
|
|-
!2
|Brian XL
|December 19, 2014
|Phenomenal Showdown
|Jamaica, NY 
|1
|
|
|
|-
!3
|Smiley
|August 21, 2015
|At Last
|Jamaica, NY 
|1
|
|
|
|-
!4
|Ethan Carter III
|April 9, 2016
|Stronger Than Ever
|Elmhurst, NY
|1
|
|
|
|-
!5
|Anthony Gangone
|September 24, 2016
|All or Nothing
|Elmhurst, NY
|1
|
|align="left"|
|
|-
!6
|Amazing Red
|August 18, 2017
|High Intensity 6
|Jamaica, NY 
|1
|
|
|
|-
!7
|Anthony Gangone
|August 17, 2018
|High Intensity 7
|New York City, NY
|2
|
|align="left"|
|
|-style="background:#e3e3e3" 
|—
|Vacated
|May 22, 2022
|—
|—
|—
|—
|
|
|-
!8
|Jacob Fatu
|
|Exodus
|New York City, NY
|1
|+
|align="left"|
|
|}

Combined reigns

Combined reigns

By team

By wrestler

Crown Jewel Championship 

Ken Broadway was the inaugural champion and shares the record of most reigns with Anthony Gangone at two. Broadway's first reign was the shortest at <1 day as he had to defend it the same night he was awarded it and subsequently lost it. TJP's reign is the longest at 727 days.

Charles Mason is the current champion in his first reign. He defeated Low Ki at Tribulations on April 15, 2022, in New York, NY.

Reigns 

|-
!1
|Ken Broadway
|December 11, 2015
|Civil War
|Jamaica, NY 
|1
|<1
|align="left"|
|
|-
!2
|Anthony Gangone
|December 11, 2015
|Civil War
|Jamaica, NY
|1
|
|align="left"|
|
|-
!3
|Ken Broadway
|August 19, 2016
|High Intensity 5
|Jamaica, NY
|2
|
|
|
|-
!4
|Lio Rush
|May 27, 2017
|Adrenaline
|Jamaica, NY
|1
|
|
|
|-
!5
|Anthony Gangone
|July 1, 2017
|Never Trust A Snake
|Elmhurst, NY
|2
|
|align="left"|
|
|-
!6
|Leroy Green
|September 29, 2017
|Chapter Two
|Elmhurst, NY
|1
|
|align="left"|
|
|-
!7
|Evander James
|October 21, 2017
|Glory Of War
|Jamaica, NY 
|
|
|
|
|-
!8
|Sami Callihan
|June 9, 2018
|Temperature Rising
|Jamaica, NY 
|1
|
|
|
|-style="background:#e3e3e3;
|
|
|December 15, 2018
|
|
|
|
|
|
|-
!9
|Mantequilla
|December 15, 2018
|HOG 8
|New York City, NY
|1
|
|align="left"|
|
|-
!10
|T. J. Perkins
|November 16, 2019
|No Limit
|New York City, NY
|1
|
|
|
|-
!11
|Low Ki
|November 12, 2021
|Born Again
|New York City, NY
|1
|
|align="left"|
|
|-
!12
|Charles Mason
|April 15, 2022
|Tribulations
|New York City, NY
|1
|+
|align="left"|
|
|}

Combined reigns

Cruiserweight Championship

Reigns

Women's Championship 

The title was created and revealed on December 1, 2016, via Instagram, and serves as the promotion's women's division championship. Violette was the inaugural champion, who established herself as champion by forcibly taking the championship from Rob Blatt, who was attacked by Violette's debuting bodyguard, Shee, at House of Glory's "Chapter 2" event on September 29, 2017, in New York City, NY. Harley Rae's reign is the longest reign at 838 days, while Bobbi Tyler has the shortest reign at 145 days.

Violette is the current champion in her record-setting second reign. She defeated Natalia Markova on September 24, 2022 at Genesis in New York City, NY.

HOG Women's Championship Tournament (2022)

Reigns 

|-
!1
|Violette
|September 29, 2017
|Chapter Two
|New York City, NY
|1
|
|align="left"|
|
|-
!2
|Sonya Strong
|August 17, 2018
|High Intensity 7
|New York City, NY
|1
|
|
|
|-
!3
|Bobbi Tyler
|April 5, 2019
|IPW Live in NYC
|New York City, NY
|1
|
|align="left"|
|
|-
!4
|Harley Rae
|August 28, 2019
|IPW:UK Area 52
|Canterbury, Kent
|1
|
|align="left"|
|
|-style="background:#e3e3e3;
|—
|Vacated
|December 13, 2021
|N/A
|N/A
|—
|—
|align="left"|
|
|-
!5
|Natalia Markova
|January 14, 2022
|Who Runs The World? Girls
|New York City, NY
|1
|
|align="left"|
|
|-
!6
|Violette
|September 24, 2022
|Genesis
|New York City, NY
|2
|+
|
|
|}

Combined reigns

See also
List of independent wrestling promotions in the United States

References

External links

Professional wrestling schools
Professional wrestling in New York (state)
American independent professional wrestling promotions based in New York (state)